Elections to the French National Assembly were held in French Cameroons on 2 January 1956.

Electoral system
The four seats allocated to the constituency were elected on two separate electoral rolls; French citizens elected one MP from the first college, whilst non-citizens elected three MPs in the second college.

Results

First college

Second college

Seat 1

Seat 2

Seat 3

References

Cameroon
Elections in Cameroon
1956 in French Cameroon
Election and referendum articles with incomplete results